Seletar Constituency was a single-member constituency of the Legislative Council and Legislative Assembly of Singapore between 1951 and 1959. It covered the Seletar area in North-East Region. 

In 1951, the constituency was formed from Rural East and Rural West constituencies. The 1952 Seletar by-election remains the only occasion on which a candidate not from the People's Action Party won unopposed.

In 1955, parts of the constituency were separated to form Bukit Panjang, Sembawang and Serangoon constituencies.

In 1959, the constituency was abolished and split into Jalan Kayu, Nee Soon, Serangoon Gardens and Thomson constituencies.

Member of Parliament

Elections

Elections in the 1950s

Historical maps

References

Singaporean electoral divisions
Seletar